KKLL (1100 AM) is a radio station broadcasting a Christian radio format. It is licensed to Webb City, Missouri, United States, and serves the Joplin area.  The station is owned by New Life Evangelistic Center, Inc.

References

External links

KLL
KLL